Dark Mirror  or The Dark Mirror may refer to:

Films
 The Dark Mirror (1920 film), a silent drama starring Dorothy Dalton
 The Dark Mirror (1946 film), a psychological thriller directed by Robert Siodmak starring Olivia de Havilland
 Dark Mirror (1984 film), a television film starring Stephen Collins
 Dark Mirror (2007 film), a film directed by Pablo Proenza, starring Lisa Vidal

Literature
 The Dark Mirror, a 1920 novel by Louis Joseph Vance
 The Dark Mirror, a 1966 Michael Faraday crime fiction novel by Basil Copper
 "Dark Mirror", a 1993 short story in the R. A. Salvatore bibliography
 Dark Mirror (Star Trek novel), a 1994 novel by Diane Duane
 Dark Mirror (Angel novel), an 2004 novel based on the American TV series Angel
 The Dark Mirror (Marillier novel), a 2004 historical fantasy in The Bridei Chronicles series by Juliet Marillier
 X-Men: Dark Mirror, a 2005 novel by Marjorie Liu

Other uses
 Syphon Filter: Dark Mirror, a PlayStation 2 and PlayStation Portable video game
 a 2020 book by Barton Gellman, Dark Mirror: Edward Snowden and the American Surveillance State

See also
 "In a Mirror, Darkly", a 2005 episode of Star Trek Enterprise
 A Scanner Darkly, a 1977 science fiction novel by Philip K. Dick, and a 2006 film
 Black Mirror (disambiguation)